Archibald Victor Dudley Gordon, 5th Marquess of Aberdeen and Temair (9 July 1913 – 7 September 1984), styled Lord Archibald Gordon from 1965 to 1974, was a Scottish writer, broadcaster, and peer. The second son of Dudley Gordon, 3rd Marquess of Aberdeen and Temair and Cécile Elizabeth Drummond, on his death in 1984 he was succeeded in the marquessate, and his other titles, by his younger brother Alastair.

Education
He attended Harrow School.

Career
He was an assistant secretary with the Council for the Protection of Rural England, 1936–1940. He joined the BBC Monitoring Service in 1940. From 1946 to 1972 he worked for the BBC Radio Talks Department. He produced The Week in Westminster as well as party political and election broadcasts between 1946 and 1966. He was head of Radio Talks and Documentaries from 1967 to 1972. On the death of his elder brother on 13 September 1974 he succeeded him as Marquess of Aberdeen and Temair, as well as inheriting his brother's other titles.

Personal life
Lord Aberdeen and Temair never married and resided with his valet in Suffolk.  At the suggestion of family friend Roy Palmer of Haughley he came to live in Haughley at The Grainge until his death.

References
'Aberdeen and Temair', Who Was Who, A & C Black, 1920–2007; online edn, Oxford University Press, Dec 2007

External links

1913 births
1984 deaths
5
BBC people
People educated at Harrow School
Deputy Lieutenants of Aberdeen